Samah Anwar, is an Egyptian actress born on April 22, 1965, in Cairo, Egypt. She appeared with Salah Zulfikar in the 1981 film Secret Visit.

References

Egyptian film actresses
1965 births
Living people